The Coulomp is a mountain river that flows through the Alpes-de-Haute-Provence department of southeastern France. Its source is near the village Aurent, part of the commune Castellet-lès-Sausses. It flows into the Var in Saint-Benoît.

References

Rivers of France
Rivers of Alpes-de-Haute-Provence
Rivers of Provence-Alpes-Côte d'Azur